

See also
Sex hormones are in the ATC group G03.
Insulins are in the ATC group A10A.

References

H